Oslare is a village in the municipality of Bujanovac, Serbia. According to the 2002 census, the town has a population of 904.

History

Serbian-Ottoman War 
After the Serbian capture of Niš (December 3–29, 1877), Ottoman Albanian troops from Debar and Tetovo fled the front and crossed the Pčinja, looting and raping along the way. On January 18, 1878, 17 armed Albanians descended from the mountains into Oslare, shouting while entering the village. They first arrived at the house of Arsa Stojković, which they looted and emptied before his eyes, enraging Stojković who proceeded to punch one of them. He was shot in the stomach and fell down, though still alive, he took a stake and delivered a mighty blow to the shooter's head, dying with him. The villagers then quickly entered an armed fight with the Albanians, killing them.

Demographic history
According to the 2002 census, the town had a population of 904. Of these, 498 (55,08%) were ethnic Albanians, and 400 (44,24%) were Serbs.

References

Populated places in Pčinja District
Albanian communities in Serbia